Streptomyces thermocarboxydus is a streptomycete bacterium species. It is moderately thermophilic and carboxydotrophic, with type strain AT37.

References

Further reading

Whitman, William B., et al., eds. Bergey's manual® of systematic bacteriology. Vol. 5. Springer, 2012.

Nakouti, Ismini, and Glyn Hobbs. "Characterisation of five siderophore producing actinomycetes from soil samples and the use of antibiotic resistance to differentiate the isolates." International Journal of Agriculture Sciences 4.3 (2012).

External links

LPSN
Type strain of Streptomyces thermocarboxydus at BacDive -  the Bacterial Diversity Metadatabase

thermocarboxydus
Bacteria described in 1998